Veerakarn Musikapong, born Veera Musikapong on 24 May 1948 in Ranot, Songkhla Province, is a Thai politician. Veera was government spokesman of Prime Minister Seni Pramoj, Deputy Minister of Agriculture, of Communications, and of Interior in the governments of Prem Tinsulanonda, secretary general of the Democrat Party, executive member of the Thai Rak Thai Party and longstanding Member of Parliament. Since 2006, he has been one of the leaders of the United Front for Democracy Against Dictatorship or Red Shirts.

References

1948 births
Veera Musikapong
Veera Musikapong
Living people
Veera Musikapong
Veera Musikapong
Veera Musikapong
Veera Musikapong
Veera Musikapong
Veera Musikapong
Veera Musikapong
Veera Musikapong
Veera Musikapong
Veera Musikapong